The  Dallas Cowboys season was the franchise's 49th season in the National Football League.  The season ended when the Cowboys were blown out by the Philadelphia Eagles 44–6 in week 17, their worst loss since the 1985 Chicago Bears came to Texas Stadium and beat the Cowboys 44–0. It was the last season the Cowboys played at Texas Stadium; they moved to Cowboys Stadium in 2009. Despite entering the last month of the season four games above .500, they failed to make the playoffs for the first time since 2005, losing three of their last four games and finishing with a 9–7 record.

Offseason

Signings
 Re-signed long snapper L. P. Ladouceur to a five-year contract extension.
 Re-signed pro-bowl left offensive tackle Flozell Adams.
 Signed veteran linebacker Zach Thomas to one-year, $3 million deal.
 Placed the franchise tag on pro-bowl free safety Ken Hamlin.
 Traded for Ex-Titan defensive back Adam "Pacman" Jones.

Departures
 Released Wide Receiver Terry Glenn
 Released fullback Oliver Hoyte who has signed with the Kansas City Chiefs.
 Cornerback Jacques Reeves joined the Houston Texans.
 Running back Julius Jones signed a four-year deal with the Seattle Seahawks.
 Safety Keith Davis signed with the Miami Dolphins, but re-signed with the Cowboys after his subsequent release from Miami.
 Defensive tackle Jason Ferguson, linebacker Akin Ayodele and tight end Anthony Fasano traded to the Miami Dolphins.

Free agents heading into the 2008 season
 Cornerback Nate Jones

Training camp

The Cowboys arrived in Oxnard, California for training camp on July 24. HBO and NFL Films filmed the Cowboys for the fourth season of Hard Knocks which premiered on August 6. The Cowboys began camp with all but three players: Felix Jones, Mike Jenkins, and Terry Glenn. Jones and Jenkins both signed contracts the next day, and flew out to California to report.
 Soon afterward, Terry Glenn was released to waivers. Owner Jerry Jones explained that, "I think at the end of the day, it had more to do with where we are right now, the managing of how he got to the field, the aspect of concentrating on the what ifs and how it might've impacted how we give our young players a chance, and how we evaluate that position." The main story lines in camp have revolved around the new addition of Adam "Pacman" Jones, and the injury to Terence Newman. Jones was proving daily in camp that he is still worthy of being named one of the top cornerbacks in the league, but was not fully reinstated to the NFL until August 28. Newman injured his groin on July 28, and is expected to be out for three weeks.
The Cowboys cut the roster from 80 to 75 immediately after training camp, then waived more players following the final pre-season game to drop the roster count to league limit of 53, one of which was 6th-round draft pick Eric Walden. Walden was picked up on waivers by the Kansas City Chiefs. The following players made it through waivers to land spots on the practice squad: Danny Amendola, Alonzo Coleman, Tearrius George, Rodney Hannah, Mike Jefferson, Marcus Dixon and Julius Crosslin. Then, in a surprising turn of events, Dallas CB Evan Ogelsby was released to make room on the roster for Special Teams Ace Keith Davis who returned to the Cowboys after being cut from the Dolphins.

2008 draft class

Notes
 The Cowboys traded their 2007 first-round (No. 22 overall) selection to the Cleveland Browns for 2007 second-round (No. 36 overall) and 2008 first-round (No. 22 overall) selections.
 The Cowboys traded their first, (No. 28 overall) fifth (No. 163 overall) and seventh-round (No. 235 overall) selections for the Seattle Seahawks' first-round (No. 25 overall) selection in order to move up in the first-round and select Mike Jenkins.
 The Cowboys traded their third-round (No. 92 overall) selection to the Detroit Lions for 2008 and 2009 fourth-round (Nos. 111 and 101 overall) selections.
 The Cowboys traded linebacker Akin Ayodele and tight end Anthony Fasano to the Miami Dolphins in exchange for a fourth-round (No. 100 overall) selection.
 The Cowboys traded their fourth-round (No. 100 overall) selection to the Oakland Raiders in exchange for fourth (No. 104 overall) and seventh-round (No. 213 overall) selections.
 The Cowboys traded their fourth-round (No. 104 overall) selection to the Cleveland Browns in exchange for fourth (No. 122 overall) and fifth-round (No. 155 overall) selections.
 The Cowboys traded their 2008 fourth-round (No. 111 overall) selection to the Browns in exchange for a 2009 third-round (No. 69 overall) selection.
 The Cowboys traded their original fourth-round (No. 126 overall) selection to the Tennessee Titans for cornerback Adam Jones. The Cowboys were to receive a conditional 2009 fourth-round selection if Jones is not reinstated, or a conditional 2009 fifth-round selection if Jones is reinstated but gets suspended again (the Cowboys received the Titans' 2009 fifth-round selection, No. 166 overall).
 The Cowboys traded their fifth (No. 155 overall) and seventh-round (No. 213 overall) selections to the Jacksonville Jaguars in exchange for a fifth-round (No. 143 overall) selection.
 The Cowboys traded defensive tackle Jason Ferguson and their 2008 sixth-round (No. 195 overall) selection to the Dolphins in exchange for 2008 and 2009 sixth-round (Nos. 167 and 197 overall) selections.

Preseason schedule

Schedule

Standings

Regular season summary
The team was coming from a 13-3 season in 2007 and there were great expectations for a Super Bowl run. During the offseason, the Cowboys signed the controversial talents of Pacman Jones and Tank Johnson. They also were the subject of the 2008 Hard Knocks TV Series.

The team began the season with 3 straight wins but lost the week-4 game at home against the Washington Redskins 24-26. Tony Romo injured the pinkie finger in his right hand in a 24-30 loss to the Arizona Cardinals in the sixth game. The Cowboys under his replacement Brad Johnson, went 1–2 the next three games, losing to the St. Louis Rams, beating the Tampa Bay Buccaneers, and losing to the New York Giants. Romo would return to play wearing a splint under the heavy bandage on his right hand in November after the bye week.

The team had a 24–33 loss in Week 16 against the Baltimore Ravens and the final game at Texas Stadium before it was demolished. In what became a de facto playoff game in the 17th week of the season against the Philadelphia Eagles on December 28, Romo and the Cowboys failed to compete in a 44–6 loss. The team finished with a 9–7 record, missing the postseason for the first time in franchise history after starting the season with a 3-0 record.

Game summaries

Week 1: at Cleveland Browns

The Cowboys began their 2008 campaign on the road against the Cleveland Browns.  In the first quarter, Dallas got the first shot as RB Marion Barber got a 1-yard TD run.  In the second quarter, the Browns would respond with QB Derek Anderson completing a 2-yard TD pass to TE Kellen Winslow.  Afterwards, the Cowboys responded with QB Tony Romo completing a 35-yard TD pass to WR Terrell Owens, along with another 1-yard TD run from Barber.  In the third quarter, Dallas pulled away with rookie RB Felix Jones getting an 11-yard TD run, which was his first carry in the NFL.  In the fourth quarter, Cleveland's only response would be kicker Phil Dawson's 34-yard field goal.

Week 2: vs. Philadelphia Eagles

Coming off their commanding road win over the Browns, the Cowboys played their Week 2 home opener under the MNF spotlight.  In the last MNF game at Texas Stadium, Dallas would duel with their NFC East foe, the Philadelphia Eagles.  In the first quarter, the Cowboys trailed early as Eagles kicker David Akers got a 34-yard field goal.  Dallas would answer in their first possession with QB Tony Romo completing a 72-yard TD pass to WR Terrell Owens.  Philadelphia replied with Akers kicking a 44-yard field goal, yet the 'Boys immediately added to their lead with rookie RB Felix Jones returning a kickoff 98 yards for a touchdown. The Eagles would take the lead with QB Donovan McNabb completing a 6-yard TD pass to RB Brian Westbrook, along with LB Chris Gocong recovering a Romo fumble in the Cowboys' endzone for a touchdown.  Dallas immediately responded with Romo and Owens hooking up with each other again on a 4-yard TD pass.

On Philadelphia's next drive, the referees made two suspect decisions. The first was a non-call on a very obvious facemask on Brian Westbrook that would have given the Eagles a first down. The next call in question was a 40-yard passing interference penalty on Anthony Henry. Replays showed that it was Greg Lewis who grabbed Henry's jersey and pulled him down, not the other way around. With that decision, the Eagles were awarded a first down on the 1-yard line. Westbrook immediately ran it in for a 1-yard TD. On their next possession, Akers' hit a 22-yard field goal. To make the game the highest scoring half ever on MNF, the Cowboys ended the half with kicker Nick Folk getting a 51-yard field goal, bringing the total points for both teams to 54.

In the third quarter, the 'Boys regained the lead with Romo's 17-yard TD pass to RB Marion Barber. In the fourth quarter, the Eagles once again took the lead with Westbrook's 1-yard TD run.  Afterwards, the Cowboys rallied with Folk nailing a 47-yard field goal and Barber getting a 1-yard TD run. The Eagles had a chance for a game-winning drive, but Dallas' defense stiffened for the victory, sacking the very elusive McNabb twice.

In a game that had 9 lead changes, it also set different point records, including most first half points in MNF history (54) and most combined points in the rivalry's history (78).

Also, Terrell Owens (3 receptions for 89 yards and 2 touchdowns) reached 132 career touchdown catches, placing him 2nd on the NFL's all-time touchdown receptions list (behind only Jerry Rice's record of 197).

Week 3: at Green Bay Packers

Coming off the MNF divisional home win over the Eagles, the Cowboys flew to Lambeau Field for a Week 3 Sunday Night duel with the Green Bay Packers. Dallas had never won in Lambeau Field heading into the game, going 0–5 (although Green Bay did play several home games in Milwaukee where the Cowboys won a few times against the Packers).

In the first quarter, Dallas got the first shot as kicker Nick Folk got a 25-yard field goal.  The Packers responded with kicker Mason Crosby getting a 36-yard field goal.  In the second quarter, Green Bay took the lead with Crosby kicking a 38-yard field goal.  The 'Boys replied with rookie RB Felix Jones getting a 60-yard TD run, becoming the first player in franchise history to have a touchdown in each of his first three games with Dallas.  In the third quarter, the Packers tried to rally as Crosby got a 33-yard field goal, yet the Cowboys responded with RB Marion Barber getting a 2-yard TD run.  In the fourth quarter, Dallas managed to put the game out of reach as QB Tony Romo completed a 52-yard TD pass to WR Miles Austin.  Green Bay tried to rally as QB Aaron Rodgers got a 1-yard TD run, yet the Big D's defense held.

With the win, not only did the Cowboys get a second-straight 3–0 start for the first time since 1976–77, but they also picked up their first-ever win at Lambeau Field.

Week 4: vs. Washington Redskins

Coming off their Sunday night road win over the Packers, the Cowboys went home for a Week 4 NFC East showdown with the Washington Redskins.  In the first quarter, the 'Boys shot first as QB Tony Romo completed a 21-yard TD pass to TE Jason Witten.  In the second quarter, the Redskins took the lead as QB Jason Campbell completed a 3-yard TD pass to WR James Thrash and a 2-yard TD pass to WR Antwaan Randle El, along with kicker Shaun Suisham getting a 20-yard field goal.  Dallas closed out the half with kicker Nick Folk getting a 36-yard field goal.

In the third quarter, the Cowboys tied the game with Romo completing a 10-yard TD pass to WR Terrell Owens.  Washington would respond with Suisham kicking a 33-yard field goal.  In the fourth quarter, the Redskins increased their lead with Suisham nailing a 33-yard and a 29-yard field goal.  The 'Boys tried to rally as Romo completed an 11-yard TD pass to WR Miles Austin.  However, Dallas' onside kick attempt failed, preserving the Redskins' win.

Week 5: vs. Cincinnati Bengals

Hoping to rebound from their divisional home loss to the Redskins, the Cowboys stayed at home for a Week 5 interconference duel with the Cincinnati Bengals.  In the first quarter, the Cowboys shot first as kicker Nick Folk got a 30-yard field goal, along with rookie RB Felix Jones getting a 33-yard TD run.  In the second quarter, Dallas increased its lead with QB Tony Romo completing a 4-yard TD pass to TE Jason Witten.  The Bengals closed out the half as kicker Shayne Graham got a 41-yard and a 31-yard field goal.

In the third quarter, Cincinnati crept closer as QB Carson Palmer completed an 18-yard TD pass to WR T. J. Houshmandzadeh. In the fourth quarter, the Bengals got within one point as Graham kicked a 40-yard field goal, yet the Cowboys responded with Romo completing a 57-yard TD pass to WR Terrell Owens. The Bengals tried to come back as Palmer completed a 10-yard TD pass to Houshmandzadeh (with a failed two-point conversion), but Dallas pulled away as Romo completed a 15-yard TD pass to WR Patrick Crayton.

Week 6: at Arizona Cardinals

Coming off their home win over the Bengals, the Cowboys flew to the University of Phoenix Stadium for a Week 6 showdown with the Arizona Cardinals.  In the first quarter, Dallas immediately trailed as Cardinals RB J.J. Arrington returned the game's opening kickoff 93 yards for a touchdown.  In the second quarter, the 'Boys responded with QB Tony Romo completing a 55-yard TD pass to WR Patrick Crayton.  In the third quarter, the Cowboys took the lead as Romo completed a 14-yard TD pass to WR Miles Austin.  Arizona would tie the game with QB Kurt Warner completing a 2-yard TD pass to WR Larry Fitzgerald.  In the fourth quarter, the Cardinals took the lead as Warner completed an 11-yard TD pass to WR Steve Breaston, along with kicker Neil Rackers getting a 41-yard field goal.  Afterwards, the 'Boys tied the game with Romo completing a 70-yard TD pass to RB Marion Barber, along with kicker Nick Folk nailing a 52-yard field goal.  However, in overtime, Arizona emerged as WR Sean Morey blocked a punt attempt, allowing LB Monty Beisel to return it 3 yards for the game-ending touchdown.

In the week following the game Tony Romo was listed as questionable with a broken right pinkie finger. In addition, Matt McBriar and Sam Hurd were placed in injured reserve, and Felix Jones was listed as out for 2–3 weeks with a hamstring injury.  Furthermore, Adam (Pacman) Jones was suspended by the NFL for a minimum of 4 weeks after an altercation with his bodyguard.

The Cowboys traded for WR Roy Williams with the Detroit Lions, in exchange for their first, third, and sixth-round picks.

Week 7: at St. Louis Rams

Hoping to rebound from their road loss to the Cardinals, and missing several key starters, the Cowboys flew to the Edward Jones Dome for a Week 7 duel with the St. Louis Rams.  With Tony Romo recovering from his injured pinkie, he was demoted to back-up for the game, allowing veteran QB Brad Johnson to get the start.

In the first quarter, the 'Boys shot first as RB Marion Barber got a 1-yard TD run.  The Rams would go on to score 34 unanswered points with QB Marc Bulger completing a 42-yard TD pass to WR Donnie Avery, along with RB Steven Jackson getting an 8-yard and a 1-yard TD run.  In the second quarter, St. Louis increased their lead as kicker Josh Brown got a 52-yard field goal.  In the third quarter, Dallas continued to struggle as Jackson got a 56-yard TD run.  In the fourth quarter, the Rams ended their domination with Brown nailing a 35-yard field goal.  Afterwards, the 'Boys got their only response as Johnson completed a 34-yard TD pass to rookie TE Martellus Bennett.

Week 8: vs. Tampa Bay Buccaneers

Hoping to rebound from their road loss to the Rams, the Cowboys went home for a Week 8 duel with the Tampa Bay Buccaneers.  With QB Tony Romo still nursing an injured pinkie, QB Brad Johnson got the start against the team that he helped win Super Bowl XXXVII.

In the first quarter, Dallas trailed early as Buccaneers kicker Matt Bryant got a pair of 36-yard field goals.  In the second quarter, the 'Boys took the lead as kicker Nick Folk got a 38-yard field goal, along with Johnson completing a 2-yard TD pass to WR Roy Williams.  In the third quarter, Dallas increased its lead with Folk making a 45-yard field goal.  Tampa Bay responded with Bryant nailing a 41-yard field goal.  Afterward, the Big D's defense held on for the victory.

Week 9: at New York Giants

Coming off their home win over the Buccaneers, the Cowboys flew to Giants Stadium for a Week 9 NFC East duel with the New York Giants.  With QB Tony Romo nursing an injured pinkie, QB Brad Johnson once again got the start.

In the first quarter, the 'Boys trailed early as Giants QB Eli Manning completed a 13-yard TD pass to TE Kevin Boss and a 5-yard TD pass to WR Steve Smith.  In the second quarter, Dallas responded with rookie CB Mike Jenkins returning an interception 23 yards for a touchdown.  New York would answer with Manning completing an 11-yard TD pass to WR Amani Toomer.  After the half, Johnson (5/11 for 71 yards and 2 interceptions) was benched for QB Brooks Bollinger.

In the third quarter, the Giants increased their lead as RB Brandon Jacobs got a 12-yard TD run.  In the fourth quarter, the 'Boys tried to rally as Bollinger completed an 8-yard TD pass to WR Terrell Owens.  However, New York pulled away as RB Derrick Ward got a 17-yard TD run.

With the loss, the Cowboys entered their bye week 5–4.

Week 11: at Washington Redskins

Coming off their bye week, the Cowboys flew to Fedex Field for a Week 11 NFC East rematch with the Washington Redskins on Sunday Night Football.

In the first quarter, the 'Boys trailed early as Redskins QB Jason Campbell completed a 2-yard TD pass to FB Mike Sellers.  In the second quarter, Dallas responded with RB Marion Barber getting a 2-yard TD run.  Washington would close out the half with kicker Shaun Suisham getting a 41-yard field goal.  After a scoreless third quarter, the Cowboys took a fourth quarter lead as QB Tony Romo completed a 25-yard TD pass to rookie TE Martellus Bennett.  Afterwards, Dallas' defense kept the Redskins' offense from making any kind of a comeback.

With the win, the Cowboys improved to 6–4.

Week 12: vs. San Francisco 49ers

Coming off their divisional road win over the Redskins, the Cowboys went home, donned their throwback uniforms, and played a Week 12 game with the San Francisco 49ers. In the first quarter, Dallas trailed early as 49ers kicker Joe Nedney made a 23-yard and a 22-yard field goal. In the second quarter, the Cowboys took a lead as QB Tony Romo completed a 75-yard TD pass to WR Terrell Owens, LB Carlos Polk blocked an Andy Lee punt into the back of the 49ers' endzone for a safety, kicker Nick Folk making a 48-yard and a 41-yard field goal, and Romo throwing a 45-yard pass to T.O., Then completing a 1-yard TD pass to TE Martellus Bennett.

In the third quarter, the Cowboys increased their lead as Romo completed a 10-yard TD pass to WR Patrick Crayton.  San Francisco answered with Nedney getting a 35-yard field goal.  In the fourth quarter, the 'Boys replied with Folk getting a 47-yard field goal.  The 49ers would try to stay in pace as QB Shaun Hill completed an 18-yard TD pass to WR Isaac Bruce, yet Dallas pulled away as Folk nailed a 42-yard field goal.  The 49ers tried to come back as Hill completed a 9-yard TD pass to RB DeShaun Foster, yet Dallas's defense held from there on out.

With the win, the Cowboys improved to 7–4.

Terrell Owens, having gone through 14-straight games without having a 100-yard receiving day, snapped his futility streak by having 7 catches for 213 yards and a touchdown.  His 213 receiving yards would be his 2nd-highest single game total in his career. Tony Romo finished with another 300 yard game giving him 13 300 yard games.

Week 13: vs. Seattle Seahawks

The Cowboys opened the game with a 5-play 71-yard drive that ended on a touchdown reception by rookie tight end Martellus Bennett. This effort marked the first time the Cowboys scored on their first drive since the last St. Louis game, and the sixth time to do so all season. On the ensuing drive, the Dallas defense forced a Seahawk fumble that was recovered by cornerback Anthony Henry. Dallas was able to drive deep into Seattle territory, and eventually gave the ball to running back Marion Barber for a 1-yard touchdown run. Following the Dallas drive, the Seahawks had to settle for a 44-yard field goal.

Once the second quarter began, the Cowboys successfully used their passing game to move to the endzone; tight end Jason Witten scored the touchdown on a 7-yard catch. The touchdown followed by the extra point extended Dallas' lead to 21–3. On the next drive, the Cowboys defense limited the Seahawks offense to a punt. Starting a fresh drive at the Cowboy 20, quarterback Tony Romo threw a 38-yard strike to Roy E. Williams. Three consecutive incompletions by Romo led the Cowboys to send in kicker Nick Folk to hit a 41-yard field goal through the uprights. After an unsuccessful offensive drive by the Seahawks, the Dallas offense returned to the field, though were forced to their first three-and-out. Once Seattle got the ball back, quarterback Matt Hasselbeck found two of his receivers who both combined for a gain of 47 yards. The Seahawks, however, lost nine of those yards on two quarterback sacks. They had to settle again for another field goal to cut Dallas' lead to 24–6. Both of the team's offenses each had one three-and-out during the 1:31 left in the half. The Cowboys got the ball back, though did not have much time to engineer a successful drive. Romo kneeled to end the half. Overall, Dallas' four scoring drives in the first half consisted of 26 plays, 17 of which occurred on a first down; just three came on third down.

Once the third quarter commenced, the Seahawks took the time to move the ball deep into the Dallas red zone. They were stopped on third down at the Dallas 7, and elected to go for their third field goal. This drive took 5:23, the longest drive thus far in the game. On Dallas' next possession, cornerback Marcus Trufant intercepted an endzone pass that was intended for wideout Terrell Owens. The Seahawks offense was unable to capitalize on the turnover, as they were unable to convert for the first down. Dallas followed with an unsuccessful drive that ended on their second punt of the game. The Seahawks faced their second three-and-out of the quarter on their ensuing possession; their punt led Dallas to field their offense at the Dallas 44. After two plays, Romo threw to Owens for a 33-yard gain. Owens scored a touchdown off a 19-yard catch on the next play, extending the Cowboys' lead to 31–9. Seattle failed again to produce a score during the two minutes left in the third quarter.

Dallas had the ball in possession once the fourth quarter began. The Cowboys gave the ball to rookie running back Tashard Choice to drain the clock. Choice contributed a total of 62 rushing yards to the drive, including long gain of 27. Despite Choice's help, Dallas had to score a field goal to complete the 6-minute drive. Trailing 34–9, the Seahawks still aimed to score a touchdown. Their effort was cut short when Cowboys cornerback Terrence Newman compiled an interception at the Dallas 2 on the Seahawks' third play of the drive. With 7:51 remaining in the game, Dallas was not able to convert for the first down and punted the ball, which the Seahawks retrieved at their 43. During the final six minutes of the game, the Seahawks pulled another three-and-out. Dallas then continued to run out the clock but had to give the ball back to Seattle. The Seahawks still had a chance to score in the final two minutes, but fell short again. The Cowboys won 34–9.

Linebacker DeMarcus Ware finished with 4 tackles and 3 sacks, which earned him the NFL on Fox's 2008 Galloping Gobbler Award.

The Jonas Brothers performed during halftime (one of the members, Nick Jonas, was born in Dallas), while Demi Lovato (also a Dallas native) performed the national anthem.

Week 14: at Pittsburgh Steelers

This was the Cowboys and Steelers' 30th all time meeting.

In a defensive battle, neither team managed to score in the 1st quarter. In the second quarter, the only scores were a 44-yard field goal by Nick Folk for Dallas and a 24-yard field by Jeff Reed for Pittsburgh. The teams went into halftime tied at 3.

In the 3rd, Tony Romo found Terrell Owens for a 12-yard touchdown pass that broke the tie. Then, a 33-yard field goal by Nick Folk sent the Cowboys into the 4th quarter with a 13–3 lead. Midway through the 4th, Jeff Reed connected on a 41-yard field goal to cut the Cowboys' lead to 13–6. Then, Ben Roethlisberger and Tight End Heath Miller hooked up for a 6-yard Steelers touchdown that tied the game at 13. On the ensuing Dallas possession, Tony Romo was intercepted by Deshea Townsend who returned it 25 yards for a touchdown, and Pittsburgh led 20–13. After the kickoff, the Cowboys failed to convert on a 4th-and-10 and the Steelers got the ball back. They were then able to run the clock out and seal the victory.

With the Cowboys falling to 8–5, the New York Giants clinched the NFC East (despite losing to the Eagles).

Week 15: vs. New York Giants

In battle for field position the first points came in the second quarter with Tony Romo connecting with Patrick Crayton on a 34-yard touchdown pass.  New York answered with a 34-yard field goal from John Carney.

As New York tried to get a drive going they contended with the a Dallas defence that leads the league in sacks.  Quarterback Eli Manning was brought down eight times during the game.  In the fourth quarter Dallas extended its small lead with a 1-yard touchdown pass to full back Deon Anderson.  After a mistake by the Dallas offensive line the Giants scored a safety.  Later John Carney nailed a 47-yard field goal to make the score 14–8 for Dallas.  With 2:24 left on the clock Dallas sealed the win with a 38-yard touchdown run by Tashard Choice.  The two-point conversion failed.

With the win, Dallas improved to 9–5. This would be the last Cowboys win at Texas Stadium and for the 2008 NFL Season.

Week 16: vs. Baltimore Ravens

Coming off their win over the Giants, the Cowboys stayed at home for a Week 16 interconference battle with the Baltimore Ravens, in what would be the final game at Texas Stadium.

In the first quarter, Dallas struck first as rookie running back Tashard Choice got a 2-yard touchdown run.  The Ravens would respond with a 26-yard field goal from kicker Matt Stover.  Baltimore would take the lead in the second quarter as Stover got a 29-yard and a 37-yard field goal.  In the third quarter, the Ravens increased their lead as quarterback Joe Flacco completed a 13-yard touchdown pass to wide receiver Derrick Mason.  The Cowboys answered in the fourth quarter as kicker Nick Folk got a 35-yard field goal, but Baltimore answered right back with Stover's 35-yard field goal.  Dallas tried to rally as quarterback Tony Romo completed a 7-yard touchdown pass to wide receiver Terrell Owens, but the Ravens struck right back as running back Willis McGahee got a 77-yard touchdown run.  The Cowboys tried to come back as Romo completed a 21-yard touchdown pass to tight end Jason Witten, but the Ravens pulled away with fullback Le'Ron McClain's 82-yard touchdown run (the longest TD run that the Cowboys would ever give up during their tenure at Texas Stadium).

With the loss, Dallas fell to 9–6 on the season and 0–3 all-time against the Ravens. For a while they lost their chances of controlling the NFC Wild Card spot, but got it back the next day with the Tampa Bay Buccaneers losing 41–24 to the San Diego Chargers.

Week 17: at. Philadelphia Eagles

Hoping to recover from their home loss to the Ravens, the Cowboys closed out their regular season at Lincoln Financial Field in a crucial Week 17 NFC East rematch with the Philadelphia Eagles, with a playoff berth on the line.  Dallas trailed early in the first quarter as Eagles David Akers got a 40-yard field goal.  Dallas would respond with kicker Nick Folk getting a 37-yard field goal.  However, in the second quarter, Philadelphia would take a huge lead as quarterback Donovan McNabb would get a 1-yard touchdown run and complete a 4-yard touchdown pass to running back Correll Buckhalter, along with a 1-yard touchdown pass to tight end Brent Celek.  Afterwards, the Eagles would close out the half with a 50-yard field goal from Akers.

In the third quarter, the Cowboys' playoff hopes continued to fade as defensive end Chris Clemons returned a fumble 73 yards for a touchdown, while cornerback Joselio Hanson returned another fumble 96 yards for a touchdown.  Philadelphia would close out the period with Akers' 41-yard field goal.

With the loss, the Cowboys finished 9–7, ensuring they would be 0–9 in Week 17 games since 2000. Also with the loss, the Cowboys were eliminated from playoff contention.

Statistics
Through Week 5

Passing

Rushing

Receiving

Kicking

Punting

Rosters

Opening training camp roster

Week one roster

Final roster

See also
 2008 AFC East standings
 2008 AFC North standings
 2008 AFC South standings
 2008 AFC West standings
 2008 NFC North standings
 2008 NFC South standings
 2008 NFC West standings

References

External links

 2008 Dallas Cowboys
 Pro Football Hall of Fame
 Dallas Cowboys Official Site

Dallas
Dallas Cowboys seasons
Dallas